Tripuraneni Gopichand (8 September 1910 – 2 November 1962) was a Telugu short story writer, novelist, editor, essayist, playwright, film director, and a radical humanist. Gopichand was the son of renowned social reformer and play writer Tripuraneni Ramaswamy. Gopichand, inspired by M.N.Roy's Radical Humanism, became the first state secretary of the Radical Democratic Party (India) Andhra Pradesh.  His second novel Asamardhuni Jivayatra (Bungler: A Journey Through Life), was the first psychological novel in Telugu literature. Gopichand was posthumously awarded the Sahitya Akademi Award for Pandita Parameswara Sastri Veelunama in 1963, the first Telugu novel to win this award.
 His novels typically features gloomy, incomplete, unsatisfied and unsatisfying protagonist tortured by a sense of guilt.

His novel "Asamardhuni Jeeva Yatra", is part of the syllabus for APPSC examinations in Telugu literature as an optional subject.

A postal stamp in his honour was released by the Government of India on his 100th birthday.

Bibliography

Novels
 Parivartanam
 Asamardhuni Jivayatra (first psychoanalysis novel in Telugu)
 Merupula Marakalu
 Pandita Parameswara Sastry Veelunaama
 Yamapasam
 Cheekati Gadulu
 Sidhilalayam
 Gadiya Padani Talupulu
 Gatinchanigatam
 Pillatemmera
 Premopahatulu

Non-fiction
 Tatvavettalu
 Postu Chaiyani Uttarulu
 Maku Unnayi Swagataalu
 Vubhayakusalopari

Filmography
 Chaduvukunna Ammayilu (1963) (Dialogues)
 Dharmadevatha (1952) (Dialogues)
 Priyuralu (1952) (Story, Dialogues and Direction)
 Perantalu (1951) (Director)
 Lakshmamma (1950) (Director)
 Gruhapravesam (1946) (Story)
 Raithubidda (1939) (Dialogues)

Family tree 

 T. Ramaswamy Choudary
Tripuraneni Gopichand
Tripuraneni Sai Chand (Actor)

References

External links 
 

1910 births
1962 deaths
Telugu writers
People from Krishna district
Screenwriters from Karnataka
Indian humorists
20th-century Indian novelists
Indian male screenwriters
Kannada screenwriters
20th-century Indian dramatists and playwrights
Novelists from Karnataka
20th-century Indian male writers
Recipients of the Sahitya Akademi Award in Telugu
20th-century Indian screenwriters